Kings of the South is a collaborative mixtape by American rappers Lil' Flip and Z-Ro. It was released on March 29, 2005 via Pay Day/Clover G Records. Production was handled by Price, Mike Dean, Oomp Camp, Lil' Flip and Z-Ro. It features guest appearances from Will-Lean, Point Blank, Trae tha Truth, B.G. Duke, C-Note, Da Black Al Capone and Yukmouth.

Track listing

Charts

References

External links

2005 albums
Lil' Flip albums
Z-Ro albums
Albums produced by Mike Dean (record producer)
Albums produced by Z-Ro
Collaborative albums
Gangsta rap albums by American artists